Cymbium cymbium, commonly known as the false elephant's snout volute, is a species of sea snail, a marine gastropod mollusk in the family Volutidae, the volutes.

Description

Distribution

References

External links

Volutidae
Gastropods described in 1758
Taxa named by Carl Linnaeus